The northern green frog (Lithobates clamitans melanota) is a subspecies of the green frog, Lithobates clamitans. It is native to the northeastern North America and has been introduced to British Columbia. Its mating call sounds like the single note of a plucked banjo. It is also quite common in the pet trade.

Description

Adult green frogs attain a snout-vent length (excluding the hind legs) of 5.5 to 9 cm (2.25 to 3.5 in).  The ground color is green or brownish-green.  Where the green back and sides fade into the white belly and chest, some black mottling may occur.  Some individuals may have light-gray mottling on the chest.  The most prominent feature is the pair of dorsolateral folds extending from behind the tympanic membranes to just beyond halfway down the back.  The male's single vocal sac is internal.  When it calls, the throat swells, but the vocal sac is not visible.

Habitat
The northern green frog dwells in marshes, swamps, ponds, lakes, springs, and other aquatic environments. It is active both day and night.

In Captivity
Northern Green frogs are kept as common pets among the pet trade, although they're mislabeled as bullfrogs. A 10 gallon half land/half water aquarium or woodland terrarium is suitable for one frog, two or more frogs will require a larger space to reduce stress and competition. Crickets, night crawlers and meal worms are sufficient in proving an adequate diet. And a routine cleaning water in the tank or the water bowl changed once a week to reduce parasites and diseases, and if tap water is used it should be treated or tested to remove harmful metals and ammonia. On average, in captivity, they live for 10 years.

References

External links
Green Frog, Nova Scotia Frogs
Green Frog, Natural Resources Canada

Amphibians of Canada
Amphibians of the United States
Lithobates
Taxa named by Constantine Samuel Rafinesque